Valerie Hall (1946-2016) was a Professor in Palaeoecology at Queen's University Belfast until her retirement in 2010, after which she remained a Professor Emerita. She gained a 2:2 in botany at Queen's University Belfast in 1968 and a PhD in Palaeoecology in 1989. She has produced a number of publications of which the best known may be Flora Hibernica, which she co-wrote along with J. Pilcher and published in 2001.

She was the Director of Research in the School of Archaeology-Palaeoecology at Queen's University Belfast.

Valerie was Vice President of the INQUA Commission for Tephrochronology and Volcanology and was the Honorary Company Secretary of the Irish Naturalists' Journal Ltd.

Publications
She produced 30 peer-reviewed papers as listed in Scopus. The most cited is "Dates of Holocene Icelandic volcanic eruptions from tephra layers in Irish peats" Pilcher, J.R., Hall, V.A., McCormac, F.G. Holocene 5 (1), pp. 103–110, (1995), which has been cited 85 times by March 2010.

 Hall, V.A. and Bunting, L. (2000) Tephra-dated pollen studies of medieval landscapes in the north of Ireland. In: Gaelic Ireland c.1250-1650: land lordship and settlement. Eds P. Duffy, D. Edwards and E. Fitzpatrick. Four Courts Press Dublin, 207–222.
 Hall, V.A. (2000) A comparative study of the documentary and pollen analytical records of the vegetational history of the Irish landscape, 200-1650 AD. Peritia 14, 342 -371.
 Hall, V.A. (2001) Ancient record keepers. Wild Ireland 1 (2), 54–56.
 Hall, V.A., Holmes, J. and Wilson, P. (2001) Holocene tephrochronological studies in the Falkland Islands. In Tephras; chronology and archaeology, (eds) E. Juvigne and J.P. Raynal. Les dossiers de l'Archeo-logis No 1, 39–44.
 Hall V.A. and Mauquoy D. (2005) Tephra-dated climate and human-impact studies during the last 1500 years from a raised bog in central Ireland. The Holocene 15, 1086–1093.
 Hall, V.A. and Pilcher, J.R. (2002) Late-Quaternary Icelandic tephras in Ireland and Great Britain: detection, characterization and usefulness. The Holocene 12, 223–230.
 Pilcher, J.R. and Hall, V.A. (2001) Flora Hibernica: the wild flowers, plants and trees of Ireland. Collins Press, Cork.

References

Irish paleontologists
Living people
Women paleontologists
Irish women scientists
20th-century Irish scientists
21st-century Irish scientists
1946 births